Cătălin Gheorghiță Golofca (born 21 April 1990) is a Romanian professional footballer who plays as a winger or an attacking midfielder for Liga I club FC Botoșani.

Career

Early career / Botoșani
Golofca joined FC Botoșani of the Romanian first division in January 2016, aged 25, but spent the rest of the 2015–16 season on loan at former club Rapid CFR Suceava. He previously only had stints with lower league teams from his native Suceava County area.

On 5 August 2016, Golofca recorded his Liga I debut in a 2–4 loss to FC Voluntari. Thirtheen days later, he scored his first goal for Botoșani in a 5–0 away thrashing of ACS Poli Timișoara. In his debut campaign at the club, Golofca amassed 34 league appearances and netted nine times.

FCSB / Return to Botoșani
After scoring three goals in the first four opening games of the 2017–18 Liga I, FCSB announced the signing of Golofca on a four-year deal on 7 August 2017. The capital-based team paid €400,000 for 40% of his economic rights. On the 15th that month he played his first European match, starting in a goalless draw with Sporting CP at the Estádio José Alvalade in the UEFA Champions League play-off round.

Golofca's only goal at FCSB came in a Cupa României 3–0 victory over ACS Poli Timișoara, on 30 November. His poor form and rumours about his nightlife made him fall out of favor and be loaned back to FC Botoșani in the 2018 winter transfer window, eventually rejoining the club on a permanent basis in the summer of that year.

CFR Cluj
On 30 August 2019, Golofca was transferred by two-time defending champions CFR Cluj for an undisclosed fee. The following day, he made his debut and assisted Adrian Păun's late goal in a 2–3 loss to Astra Giurgiu.

Style of play
Golofca primarily plays as a winger on the right flank, although he has been deployed in the centre as an attacking midfielder or even a main striker on occasion.

Career statistics

Club

Honours
Rapid CFR Suceava
Liga III: 2011–12

CFR Cluj
Liga I: 2019–20

Sepsi OSK 
Cupa României: 2021–22
Supercupa României: 2022

References

External links

1990 births
Living people
Sportspeople from Suceava
Romanian footballers
Association football midfielders
Association football wingers
Liga I players
Liga II players
Liga III players
ACS Foresta Suceava players
FC Botoșani players
FC Steaua București players
CFR Cluj players
Sepsi OSK Sfântu Gheorghe players